Salinas de Hidalgo, San Luis Potosí, Mexico also known as Salinas del Peñón Blanco, is a small town located in the northwestern part of the state. It is the seat of Salinas municipality in Mexico.

It attracts a variety of tourists because of its historical contents, and quality of being. It is believed that at one time it used to belong to the colonial state Zacatecas, but even today, people still argue whether it was.  It is a municipal seat surrounded by ranches and places that seem of interest because of its mass in culture, and religious values. Salinas is also known for its beautiful mountain range outside on the eastern part of the town.

Government

Municipal presidents

References

Populated places in San Luis Potosí